Sue Gregory (also known as Sue Taylor) (born 27 July 1971) is a former association football player who represented New Zealand at international level.

Gregory made her Football Ferns début in a 7–0 win over Trinidad & Tobago on 8 August 1993, and finished her international career with seven caps to her credit.

References

1971 births
Living people
New Zealand women's association footballers
New Zealand women's international footballers
Women's association footballers not categorized by position